Jerzy Władysław Zdrada (born 26 November 1936 in Częstochowa) is a Polish historian and politician.

Biography
He is a member of the Polish Academy of Sciences and a professor at the Jagiellonian University since 1993. As a historian, he specializes in the history of Poland in the 19th century.

He was an activist of the Solidarity movement in communist Poland. After the fall of communism, he was a member of the Democratic Union (UD) and Freedom Union (UW) parties. He was a deputy to the Polish parliament (Sejm) from 1989 to 1997. Afterwards, he was a Deputy Minister in the cabinet of Jerzy Buzek (1997–2001). Afterwards, he retired from active politics.

In 2007, Zdrada was awarded the Commander's Cross with Star of the Order of Polonia Restituta.

Works
 Zmierzch Czartoryskich, 1969
 Jarosław Dąbrowski: 1836-1871, 1973
 Historia Dyplomacji Polskiej Part Three (co-author), 1982
 Wielka Emigracja po Powstaniu Listopadowym, 1987
 Historia Polski 1795-1914, 2005

References
 Jerzy Zdrada, Sejm deputy page
 Jerzy Zdrada, entry at Encyklopedia Solidarności

1936 births
Living people
People from Częstochowa
People from Kielce Voivodeship (1919–1939)
Democratic Union (Poland) politicians
Freedom Union (Poland) politicians
Members of the Contract Sejm
Members of the Polish Sejm 1991–1993
Members of the Polish Sejm 1993–1997
Solidarity (Polish trade union) activists
20th-century Polish historians
Polish male non-fiction writers
Jagiellonian University alumni
Academic staff of Jagiellonian University
Commanders with Star of the Order of Polonia Restituta
21st-century Polish historians